The , signed as Route 6, is one of the tolled routes of the Shuto Expressway system serving the Greater Tokyo Area. It is one two expressways signed as Route 6 in the system, the other expressway signed as Route 6 is the Misato Route. It connects Tokyo's Inner Circular Route in central Tokyo to the Central Circular Route and the Misato Route, which eventually leads to the Jōban Expressway that connects the Kantō region to the Tōhoku region.

Route description

Route 6 begins at Edobashi Junction with the Inner Circular Route in Chūō City above Nihonbashi, Japan's kilometre zero. From there it travels northeast through Sumida before crossing over the Arakawa River into Katsushika where Route 6 ends at Horikiri Junction with the northeastern section of the Central Circular Route.

The speed limit on the Mukojima Route is set at 60 km/h.

History
The first section of the Mukojima Route between the expressway's southern terminus at Edobashi Junction and Mukojima, was opened to traffic on 21 March 1971. Hakozaki Junction, where the expressway meets the Fukagawa Route, was opened on 5 February 1980. The final section of the expressway between Mukojima and its northern terminus at Horikiri Junction was opened on 30 March 1982.

Junction list

See also

References

External links

6-Mukojima
1971 establishments in Japan
Roads in Tokyo